The Oboe Concerto is a concerto for a solo oboe and orchestra by the American composer Jennifer Higdon.  The work was commissioned by the Minnesota Commissioning Club and was premiered on September 9, 2005 by the oboist Kathy Greenbank and the Saint Paul Chamber Orchestra.  Higdon later reworked the piece into her Soprano Sax Concerto in 2007.

Composition
The Oboe Concerto is composed in a single movement and has a duration of roughly 17 minutes.  Higdon described the composition of the piece in the score program notes, writing:
She added, "I have always thought of the oboe as being a most majestic instrument, and it was a pleasure to be able to create a work that would highlight its beauty and grace."

Instrumentation
The work is scored for a solo oboe and an orchestra comprising two flutes (2nd doubling piccolo), oboe, English horn, two clarinets, two bassoons, two horns, two trumpets, one percussionist, and strings.

Reception
Reviewing the world premiere, Michael Anthony of the Star Tribune lauded the piece, remarking, "Higdon has written a truly appealing work, the appeal of which is apparent on first hearing."  He added:
Higdon herself has regarded the piece as one of her favorites among her own works, alongside blue cathedral and her Concerto for Orchestra.

See also
List of compositions by Jennifer Higdon

References

Concertos by Jennifer Higdon
2005 compositions
Higdon